Wilfred Blackwell Beard  (18 January 1891 – 14 December 1967) was a British trade unionist.

Born in Manchester, Beard worked as a patternmaker and became active in the United Patternmakers Association, first as a local organiser, then as secretary of its Lancashire and Cheshire district.  In his early life, he was also involved in amateur dramatics.

In 1912, he became a full-time union official.  He was elected as general secretary of the Patternmakers in 1941, serving until his death in 1967, in which role he was known for his interest in trade union education, and his opposition to communism.  He also served on the General Council of the Trades Union Congress (TUC) from 1947, and was President of the TUC in 1955/56.  In addition, he chaired the TUC's Education Committee for many years, and served on a number of government commissions.  He served on the Iron and Steel Board in the early 1950s, but resigned in 1953 following pressure from his union.  In 1958/59, he was President of the Confederation of Shipbuilding and Engineering Unions.

Beard was made an OBE in 1948.  However, it is recorded that in 1959 he declined the higher award of a CBE.

Beard stood down from the TUC General Council at its 1967 Congress, and died unexpectedly before the end of the year.

References

1891 births
1967 deaths
General Secretaries of the United Patternmakers' Association
Trade unionists from Manchester
Presidents of the Trades Union Congress
Officers of the Order of the British Empire